Gabriel Ruotsalainen (13 March 1893 – 27 June 1966) was a Finnish long-distance runner. He competed in the marathon at the 1924 Summer Olympics.

References

1893 births
1966 deaths
Finnish male long-distance runners
Finnish male marathon runners
Olympic athletes of Finland
Athletes (track and field) at the 1924 Summer Olympics
Athletes from Helsinki